The following lists events that happened during 1974 in Rhodesia.

Incumbents
 President: Clifford Dupont
 Prime Minister: Ian Smith

Events

March
2 March - At the African National Council	inaugural conference, an agreement is reached on a mandate for continuing talks with the Rhodesian regime

June
2 June - The African National Council reject the proposals agreed upon between Bishop Abel Muzorewa and Ian Smith

July
3 July - An African National Council  delegation tells the British Government that it is not prepared to continue talks with the Rhodesian regime
30 July - The Rhodesian Front wins the Rhodesia general election

November
Detained activists Joshua Nkomo, Zimbabwe African People's Union and Ndabaningi Sithole, founder Zimbabwe African National Union are allowed to attend the meetings in Lusaka, Zambia with the presidents of Botswana, Tanzania and Zambia and African National Council with representatives of the Rhodesian government

December
9 December - The Lusaka Declaration is signed uniting Zimbabwe African People's Union, Zimbabwe African National Union and African National Council under the United African National Council banner
11 December - A ceasefire is agreed

Births
 January 1 — Samukeliso Moyo, long-distance runner

References

 
Years of the 20th century in Zimbabwe
Rhodesia
Rhodesia
1970s in Rhodesia